The Salisbury Seagulls baseball team represents Salisbury University, in Salisbury, Maryland in college baseball. The program is classified in the NCAA Division III, and the team competes in the Coast to Coast Athletic Conference. The team is coached by Troy Brohawn.

The Salisbury baseball team has been to the College World Series seven times, recorded 28 NCAA appearances, and 17 Coast to Coast Championships.

Facilities
The Seagulls play home games at Donnie Williams Sea Gull Baseball Stadium, a 500 seat stadium which has been home to the program since 2018. Previously, the Seagulls had played at Henry S. Parker Athletic Complex as well as briefly playing at Arthur W. Perdue Stadium.

Head coaches

Individual awards

Coast to Coast Player of the Year 
Jason Ewing (2001)
Nick Pegelow (2004)
Justin Armiger (2008)
Eric Willey (2008)
Mike Celenza (2009) 
Tom LaBriola (2016)
Pete Grasso (2017)
Justin Meekins (2021)
Clayton Dwyer (2021)
Kavi Caster (2022)
Jimmy Adkins (2022)

Coast to Coast Coach of the Year 
Deane Deshone (1995)
Robb Disbennett (2000)
Doug Fleetwood (2001-2004, 2006-2009, 2012, 2013)
Troy Brohawn (2017, 2021, 2022)

Coast to Coast Rookie of the Year 
Greg Lemon (2003) 
Dustin Herbert (2008)
Bill Root (2011)

References

Salisbury Sea Gulls